Narrows Inlet formerly Narrows Arm is a fjord branching east from Sechelt Inlet in British Columbia, Canada.

About halfway up the inlet lies the Tzoonie Narrows site of Sechelt Inlets Marine Provincial Park.

References

Fjords of British Columbia
Sunshine Coast (British Columbia)
Inlets of British Columbia